

Kit 
Supplier: Armani / Sponsor: Armani Exchange

Team

Players 
Two captains have been chosen for the 2021–22 LBA season, Melli and Rodríguez.

Depth chart

Squad changes

In 

|}

Out 

|}

Confirmed 

|}

Coach

On loan

Staff and management

Pre-season: Paris European Games

Competitions

Overview

Supercup

Serie A Regular Season

League table

Results summary

Results by round

Matches

EuroLeague Regular Season

League table

Results summary

Results by round

Matches

Statistics 
As of December 19, 2021.

Individual game highs 

Notes
  at least 5 attempts
  match ended in overtime

Team game highs 

Notes
  match ended in overtime

References 

2021–22 in Italian basketball by club
2021–22 EuroLeague by club